Scaevius milii, the green-striped coral bream, is a species of threadfin bream native to the western Pacific Ocean. This species is only of minor importance to local commercial fisheries, and is the only known member of its genus.

References

Nemipteridae
Fish described in 1823